María del Monte Tejado Algaba (born 26 April 1962 in Seville, Andalusia) is a Spanish folk singer and TV and radio hostess. She's most known in Spain as "La Reina de las Sevillanas" (The Queen of the Sevillanas).

Biography 
María del Monte was born on 26 April 1962 in Seville, Andalusia. In 1982 won a TV contest show in Ceuta and thereafter released her first album. With the second one titled Cántame sevillanas being a hit in Spain and achieved triple Platinum disc (thirteen in her long career). In this album there's her most famous single: Cántame.

Also has worked in several TV and radio programs. In 1993 hosted Vamos juntos in Canal Sur Radio and three years later in Antena 3 in Al compás de la copla. In 1998 she appeared in TVE in a special TV-Show Esa copla me suena and Especial Feria de Abril.

She was linked romantically with  another spanish singer, Isabel Pantoja, for several years. And now is the wife of the journalist Inmaculada Casal.

Discography 
 1988 Cántame Sevillanas
 1989 Besos de luna
 1989 Acompañame
 1991 Al Alba
 1991 Ahora
 1992 Con el Alma
 1993 Reina de las sevillanas
 1996 He Intentado Imaginar
 1998 Cartas de Amor
 1998 Digan lo que digan
 1999 De Siempre: Antología de las Sevillanas volumen I
 2000 El dolor del amor: Antología de las Sevillanas volumen II
 2002 Con otro aire
 2003 Cosas de la vida: Antología de las sevillanas Volumen III
 2004 Olé, Olé
 2005 Un Chaparrón
 2011 Cómo te echo de menos
 2022 Todo vuelve

TV career 
 Gente joven (1982), (TVE) - Contestant.
 Al compás de la copla (1996), (Antena 3)
 Esa copla me suena (1998), (TVE)
 Los debates de Hermida (2000), (Antena 3) - Talk show guest.
 La canción de mi querer (2000), (TVE)
 Cántame (2000), (Canal Sur) - Hostess
 Contigo (2000-2002), (Canal Sur) - Hostess
 Shalakabula (2005), (Canal Sur).
 El club de Flo (2006), (La Sexta) - Talk show guest
 La tarde con María (2007-2009), (Canal Sur) - Hostess
 ¿Dónde estás corazón? DEC (2011), (Antena 3), - Hostess.
 Tu cara me suena (2012-2013), (Antena 3), - Contestant.
 Uno de Los Nuestros (2013), (TVE), - Judgess.
 Tu cara me suena - Mini (2014), (Antena 3), - Tutor.
 Yo Soy del Sur (2016–2019), (Canal Sur) - Hostess

References

External links 

Singers from Andalusia
1962 births
Living people